Julia Sanderson (born Julia Ellen Sackett; August 27, 1887 – January 27, 1975) was a Broadway actress and singer. In 1887, she was born in Springfield, Massachusetts to parents Albert H. Sackett (also a Broadway actor) and Jeanette Elvira Sanderson.

She used her mother's maiden name as her stage name. She appeared in the Forepaugh Circus (based in Philadelphia) as a child. She then moved to Broadway, where she appeared in Jerome Kern musicals. She was a hit in England, but returned to the United States.

Stage career
She was first managed within the family circle as a child and teenaged actor, with assistance from her Broadway-experienced father and her mother. At the age of 18 she was in a show called "Brewster's Millions". She then played in the chorus of "Winsome Winnie" and as understudy to actress Miss Paula Edwardes. She was also considered for a part in a show called "The Motor Girl", considered appropriate because of her interest and ownership of the early automobile.

1906 continued to prove busy as she went into the part of Mrs. Pineapple in "The Chinese Honeymoon". After this she was retained to play Mataya in "Wang" with De Wolf Hopper. Then she played a part in Fantana. She then had a cast part in "The Tourists" but resigned from the company in December 1906. She appeared in The Dairymaids, opening in Atlantic City in August 1907, then at the Criterion Theatre New York City and on tour in the 1907 season before going across to the United Kingdom, having been engaged by Charles Frohman.

Marriages
She was married three times but had no children. Her first marriage was to Tod Sloan, a jockey, on 22 September 1907. She sought and obtained a divorce from him Feb. 10, 1913. Her second marriage was to Navy Lieutenant Commander Bradford Barnette, head of the United States Navy's Hydrographic Department, and son of Rear Admiral W.G. Barnette USN. Her third marriage was to singer Frank Crumit. They courted for six years while appearing in the musical Tangerine before marrying on July 1, 1927.

Sanderson was sued for divorce in September 1922 by her second husband, Barnette, with Crumit, 33, named as co-respondent. Crumit was at the time still married to a Connecticut woman.

Crumit and Sanderson wed in 1928, and they retired briefly to Dunrovin, their country home at Longmeadow a suburb of Springfield. In 1930, they began working as a radio team, singing duets and engaging in comedy dialogues. The couple starred in Blackstone Plantation, which was broadcast on CBS (1929-1930) and on NBC (1930-1934). They performed as the "Singing Sweethearts." In 1930, they continued with a popular quiz show, The Battle of the Sexes, which ran 13 years, Crumit and Sanderson drove from Massachusetts to New York City, a four-hour trip, twice a week to do their radio show. Their final broadcast was aired the day before Crumit's death of a heart attack in New York City on September 7, 1943.

Filmography
Two Daughters of Eve (1912 D.W. Griffith)*short (unconfirmed)
The Runaway (1917 Mutual)

Retirement and death
After Crumit's death, Sanderson retired from the stage, and returned to live in Springfield, Massachusetts at her estate. She died in Springfield on January 27, 1975, aged 87.

Legacy
The Julia Sanderson Theater was named after her in Springfield and is on the U.S. National Register of Historic Places.

References

External links

 
 
 Article & Photo, National Magazine, October 1905
 Julia Sanderson papers, 1913-1935, bulk (1913-1928) held by the Billy Rose Theatre Division, New York Public Library for the Performing Arts
Julia Sanderson portrait gallery New York Public Library Billy Rose Collection
Julia Sanderson recording of Why Do Stars Come Out At Night ca .1930s (with Frank Crumit introducing)
 Julia Sanderson University of Washington, Sayre collection
Sanderson and her mother riding in open touring car, 1910

1887 births
1975 deaths
20th-century American actresses
19th-century American actresses
American stage actresses
Actresses from Massachusetts
American musical theatre actresses
American radio actresses
Actors from Springfield, Massachusetts
Singers from Massachusetts
Vaudeville performers
Musicians from Springfield, Massachusetts
20th-century American singers
20th-century American women singers